Johan Peter Lundgren (born 4 October 1966) is a Swedish businessman, the chief executive officer (CEO) of the British airline easyJet since December 2017.

Early life
Johan Peter Lundgren was born in Sweden on 4 October 1966. He lived in Bondsjöhöjden, and went to school in Härnösand, on the eastern coast of mid-Sweden in Ångermanland. He left school at 16 to concentrate solely on music. From 1982 to 1985 Lundgren studied classical trombone in Sweden, the UK and the USA. He aspired to become a trombonist after listening to Christian Lindberg. He auditioned for the Royal Academy of Music, but was not accepted to the conservatoire as that year it was not accepting any trombone players.

Lundgren then moved to Gothenburg. He worked as a tour guide. He attended courses at the Stockholm School of Economics in 1993 and completed the Programme for Executive Development at the International Institute for Management Development (IMD) in Switzerland in 1996.

Career

TUI Group
In 1986, he joined Fritidsresor, a Swedish travel operator, which was later bought by TUI Group (TUI Sverige) in 2001.

He later worked for Fritidsresegruppen i Norden and Svenska Fritidsresor.

In October 2010, he became managing director of TUI Travel UK & Ireland (Tourism Union International). 

He became the deputy chief executive of TUI Group on 20 October 2011, where he was paid £605,000 in 2011. He resigned as deputy chief executive of the company in 2015, frustrated with its restructuring.

EasyJet
Lundgren supposedly became the CEO of EasyJet on 1 December 2017, replacing Carolyn McCall. One of his first duties was to hire a chief data officer. He also hired a former colleague from TUI to create a hotel and loyalty scheme to grow bookings through easyJet's online websites. Another one of his first moves was EasyJet's take over of Air Berlin. Regarding his rumored annual pay of £740,000, it is believed he asked the board that it be reduced to £706,000, his predecessor's last salary. In September 2018, he suggested there should be a law to favour more women pilots in the industry.

In June 2018, he announced that EasyJet would be using electric planes within 10 years.

In July 2018, he reiterated easyJet's interest in acquiring a controlling stake in Alitalia. In April 2019, he inaugurated easyJet's new base in Nantes.

In May 2019, he faced criticism for raising the price of the ticket to Madrid to £1,500 after two British teams were qualified for the finals of the 2018–19 UEFA Champions League.

Personal life
Lundgren is married to Maria, and has boy and girl twins. He has one house in London, and another in the Balearic Islands. In 2009 he gave a kidney to his brother Per Lundgren, a musician, by kidney transplantation.

References

1966 births
20th-century classical trombonists
21st-century classical trombonists
Living people
People from Härnösand
Stockholm School of Economics alumni
Swedish airline chief executives
Swedish classical trombonists
TUI Group